Jemma Walker is an English actress, known for portraying Siobhan Jones Callan in Family Affairs and Sasha Perkins in EastEnders.

Background
Born in Essex, Walker was a dancer until the age of sixteen. She studied for a Drama BTEC at Barking College, and went on to train at the Arts Educational School in Chiswick.

Career
Walker played barmaid Siobhan Jones Callan in Family Affairs for four years, before joining EastEnders as former escort Sasha Perkins. Discussing the two roles, she said:

"In Family Affairs, my character...was down and victimised, and trying to kill herself, so after four years of misery it was a lovely chance to play a lighter character. There were moments where it wasn't all hunky dory, but at the time there were lots of depressing and meaningful storylines going on, so it was nice to offer some light relief!"

On television, Walker has also appeared in episodes of The Bill, Doctors, Hotel Babylon and Jonathan Creek. Her film credits include EMR (2004) and Love's Kitchen (2010).

Jemma has recently been playing the character of Mollie, a guesthouse owner, in the first UK tour of Agatha Christie's The Mousetrap.  (2012)

Filmography

Theatre
Ladies' Day, Hull Truck Theatre, October 2006 (playing Shelley)
Ladies Down Under, Hull Truck Theatre, April - May 2007 (playing Shelley)
Market Boy, Olivier Theatre, June - August 2006, (playing Most Beautiful Girl in Romford)
The Mousetrap - 60th Anniversary Tour - 2012 & 2013
"The Graft" Theatre Royal Stratford East 2011

References

External links

English soap opera actresses
English television actresses
English film actresses
Actresses from Essex
People educated at the Arts Educational Schools
Year of birth missing (living people)
Living people
20th-century English actresses
21st-century English actresses